Vitaliy Balytskyi (22 August 1978 – 23 July 2018) was a Ukrainian football player and manager.

References

External links
Profile at FFU
 

1978 births
Sportspeople from Khmelnytskyi, Ukraine
2018 deaths
Ukrainian footballers
Ukrainian football managers
FC Advis Khmelnytskyi players
FC Podillya Khmelnytskyi players
FC CSKA Kyiv players
Ukrainian Premier League players
Russian Premier League players
Liga I players
FC Arsenal Kyiv players
FC Spartak Vladikavkaz players
Ukrainian expatriate footballers
Expatriate footballers in Russia
FC Volyn Lutsk players
FC Zirka Kropyvnytskyi players
FC Nyva Vinnytsia players
CFR Cluj players
Expatriate footballers in Romania
FC Nafkom Brovary players
FC Knyazha Shchaslyve players
FC Dynamo Khmelnytskyi players
FC Komunalnyk Luhansk players
Association football defenders